The Invader 36 is a Canadian sailboat, that was designed by C&C Design specifically for Hinterhoeller Yachts and first built in 1965.

The Invader 36 design was developed into the Frigate 36 in 1968, by shortening the long keel into a stub long keel, adding a centreboard and increasing the sail area.

Production
The Invader 36 design was built by Hinterhoeller Yachts in Canada, but the majority were constructed at Belleville Marine Yard, both of which became part of C&C Yachts. Production ran from 1965 to 1969, but it is now out of production.

Design
The Invader 36 is a recreational keelboat, built predominantly of fiberglass, with wood trim. It has a masthead sloop rig, a raked stem, a raised counter transom, a keel-mounted rudder controlled by a wheel and a fixed long keel. It displaces  and carries  of ballast.

See also
List of sailing boat types

Related development
Frigate 36

Similar sailboats
Bayfield 36
C&C 36-1
C&C 36R
C&C 110
Catalina 36
Columbia 36
Coronado 35
CS 36
Ericson 36
Hinterhoeller F3
Hunter 36
Hunter 36-2
Hunter 36 Legend
Hunter 36 Vision
Nonsuch 36
Portman 36
S2 11.0
Seidelmann 37
Vancouver 36 (Harris)
Watkins 36
Watkins 36C

References

Keelboats
1960s sailboat type designs
Sailing yachts
Sailboat type designs by C&C Design
Sailboat types built by Hinterhoeller Yachts
Sailboat types built by C&C Yachts